Belgium competed at the 1912 Summer Olympics in Stockholm, Sweden.

Medalists

Aquatics

Swimming

Five swimmers competed for Belgium at the 1912 Games. It was the third time the nation had competed in swimming, a sport in which Belgium had competed each time the country appeared at the Olympics.

None of the Belgian swimmers advanced to the finals in their individual events; two reached the semifinals.

(Ranks given are within the swimmer's heat.)

 Men

 Women

Water polo

Belgium made its third Olympic water polo appearance in 1912, having competed both times the country had sent athletes to the Olympics previously. After taking the silver medals in 1908 and 1900, the Belgians were only able to win a bronze at these Games.

Belgium had the misfortune of meeting eventual gold medalists Great Britain in the quarterfinals, though this misfortune was mitigated by the use of the Bergvall System in the tournament (giving Belgium an opportunity to take silver even after this defeat). The Belgian squad gave the British side the greatest challenge the latter faced all tournament, taking the match into extra time before falling. In the repechage rounds, the Belgians defeated both of the other quarterfinal losers in turn. They then beat the losing finalist Austrians to set up a match against Sweden for the silver and bronze medals. This was the fifth match of the tournament for Belgium (the most of any team—the Belgians were the only side to play every other team in 1912), and the Swedes proved too much and defeated Belgium 4–2.

 Quarterfinals

 Repechage semifinal

 Repechage final

 Silver round 2

 Silver medal match

Athletics

2 athletes competed for Belgium in 1912. It was the country's second appearance in athletics.

Ranks given are within that athlete's heat.

Cycling

A single cyclist represented Belgium. It was the third appearance of the nation in cycling, in which Belgium had competed each time the nation appeared at the Olympics. Jean Patou, who had also competed in 1908, was the only Belgian cyclist and did not finish the time trial.

Road cycling

Equestrian

 Dressage

 Eventing
(The maximum score in each of the five events was 10.00 points. Ranks given are for the cumulative score after each event. Team score is the sum of the top three individual scores.)

 Jumping

Fencing

12 fencers represented Belgium. It was the third appearance of the nation in fencing, in which Belgium had competed each time the nation appeared at the Olympics. The Belgians had great success in the épée event, placing four fencers in the final and taking three of the top four places, including the gold and bronze medals. They also took the gold medal in the team épée event. These gold medals were the first Olympic championships won by Belgian fencers; the country's best result before 1912 was a bronze medal.
Ragnar Wicksell

Rowing 

Six rowers represented Belgium. It was the nation's third appearance in rowing. Veirman took the silver medal in the single sculls, as Belgium took a single silver medal in rowing for the third time.

(Ranks given are within each crew's heat.)

Wrestling

Greco-Roman

Belgium sent a single wrestler in 1912. It was the nation's second Olympic wrestling appearance, with the nation not having competed in the Olympics in 1896 or 1904 and wrestling not having been on the programme in 1900. Gerstmans, competing in the heavyweight class, lost his first two matches and was quickly eliminated.

References
Official Olympic Reports
International Olympic Committee results database

Nations at the 1912 Summer Olympics
1912
Olympics